The Church St. Petka, Kumanovo  is an Eastern Orthodox church in Bedinje neighborhood in Kumanovo, North Macedonia.

References

Churches in Kumanovo
Macedonian Orthodox churches